Doubt is an American drama television series that premiered on CBS on February 15, 2017 and concluded on August 12, 2017. The series was created by Tony Phelan and Joan Rater, and stars Katherine Heigl in the lead role of Sadie Ellis, a brilliant attorney who falls for her client (Steven Pasquale), an altruistic pediatric surgeon recently accused of murdering his girlfriend 24 years earlier. CBS gave the show a series order in May 2016. After only two episodes had aired, CBS announced that they were pulling the series from their schedule, leaving the future of the remaining unaired episodes in doubt. It was the first official cancellation of the 2016–17 season, following weak viewership. CBS later announced that the series would return on July 1, 2017 to burn off the remaining 11 episodes.

Cast and characters
 Katherine Heigl as Sadie Ellis, a defense attorney at Roth & Associates, an elite New York law firm run by her foster father, Isaiah Roth. Sadie is defending Billy Brennan, but begins to develop feelings for him.
 Dulé Hill as Albert Cobb, Sadie's best friend, and co-worker at Roth & Associates.
 Laverne Cox as Cameron "Cam" Wirth, Sadie's co-worker. A transgender woman and Yale Law School alumna, Cam feels passionate about her work, especially in cases involving civil rights for minorities. Cam begins dating DA Peter Garrett, her former classmate at Yale.
 Dreama Walker as Tiffany Simon, Sadie's co-worker, and Cam's frequent collaborator. Tiffany is a recent law school graduate, who was raised in Iowa.
 Kobi Libii as Nick Brady, a reformed convict, who comes to the firm as a recent parolee. He studied law while incarcerated.
 Steven Pasquale as William "Billy" Brennan, a prominent surgeon, who is on trial for the murder of his ex-girlfriend, Amy Meyers, 26 years prior. Billy grew up in a tumultuous family, with his Senator father and mother's marriage on the rocks, and his adoptive sister resenting him. Billy eventually falls in love with Sadie, and they begin a secret relationship.
 Elliott Gould as Isaiah Roth, a prominent lawyer in New York City, who takes pride in defending the defenseless. Isaiah raised Sadie, following her mother's incarceration. He is concerned Sadie and Billy's relationship will jeopardize not only Billy's conviction, but Sadie's future as well.

Recurring
 Judith Light as Carolyn Rice, Sadie's mother. Carolyn has been incarcerated for the past thirty years, after a robbery she participated in went wrong and a police officer ended up fatally shot. Following her sentencing, Sadie was raised by Isaiah Roth, Carolyn's close friend and lawyer. Later in the series, Carolyn reveals she has stage four cancer, and wants to be with Sadie when she dies.
 Lauren Blumenfeld as Lucy Alexander, Sadie's absent-minded assistant.
 Tara Karsian as Tanya, the firm's receptionist.
 Ben Lawson as DA Peter Garrett, the district attorney, who is Cam's former classmate. He frequently pursues her romantically, but she wants to take things slow.
 Cassidy Freeman as ADA Audrey Burris.
 Patrick Fischler as ADA Alan Markes.
 Larry Sullivan as ADA Asher Lowman.

Episodes

Production
The series was originally proposed for the 2015–2016 television season, originally casting KaDee Strickland and Teddy Sears in the lead roles. However, CBS decided to retool the series for the 2016–2017 television season, with Heigl and Pasquale re-cast in the lead roles, and picked it up on May 14, 2016. Cox's casting in the series has made her the first transgender person to play a transgender series regular on broadcast television.

Although CBS canceled the series after just two episodes, a total of 13 episodes were produced.

Reception
The first season of Doubt has received mixed reviews from television critics. Review aggregator website Rotten Tomatoes reported an approval rating of 53%, based on 30 reviews, with an average rating of 5.8/10. The site's critical consensus reads, "Doubt struggles with tone in its premiere episode, but ultimately develops into a decent courtroom/workplace drama that is buoyed by a talented cast." Metacritic reported a score of 58 out of 100, based on 25 critics, indicating "mixed or average reviews".

Ratings

References

External links
 
 

2010s American LGBT-related drama television series
2017 American television series debuts
2017 American television series endings
2010s American legal television series
CBS original programming
English-language television shows
New York Supreme Court
Television series by CBS Studios
Television shows set in New York City
Transgender-related television shows